Wellington Windmill was a weather boarded smock windmill which stood near to what is now Dukes Court, Barking, in the London Borough of Barking and Dagenham (then a part of Essex).

The mill was built in 1815 to assist with work at the nearby mill at Marks Gate. It was named in celebration of his victory at the Battle of Waterloo. In the later 19th century, it was occupied by Francis Whitbourne. The Firman family later occupied the mill; and converted it to electric power in 1906. It remained in use until 1926.

References

Former buildings and structures in the London Borough of Barking and Dagenham
Former windmills in London
Windmills completed in 1815
Buildings and structures demolished in 1926
Smock mills in England
Grinding mills in the United Kingdom